The Gambia Police Force is the primary independent domestic intelligence, security and law enforcement agency in The Gambia. Under the Ministry of the Interior, the force is headed by an Inspector General of Police. The current size of the force is 5,000 uniformed and plain-clothed officers. The Gambia Police Force deals with corruption under a specialized Fraud and Commercial crimes unit (Interpol 2018).

History 

The first police force in The Gambia was the Gambia River Police, formed in 1855. Prior to this, security in the small colonial enclaves was provided by British troops and a small local militia, drawn from traders, freed slaves, and other settlers. The River Police's role was to control smuggling, enforce taxation, and prevent insurgencies. Its 10 men were aided by the local militia, and were further reinforced in 1866 by the establishment of the paramilitary Gambia Constabulary. Initially formed with 40 constables, this was increased to 100 in 1870. At this point, all imperial troops were withdrawn from the colony and policing was left to the Constabulary and local militia.

A Frontier Police force was founded in 1895. The establishment of the West African Frontier Force in 1900 led to the creation of the Gambia Company in 1901, which also aided in maintaining the colony's security. In the Protectorate, security was the responsibility of the district chief. In 1909, the British issued an ordinance granting the chiefs to appoint 'badge messengers', who were allowed to keep the peace and had all the same authority of the colony police. Francis has noted how "Although Gambians staffed the lower level of the force, to the local population, the police and security services, limited as they were, represented an essentially foreign presence."

At independence in 1965, the Constabulary and Frontier Police merged to create the Gambia Police Force. Following the Gambia Regiment being disbanded in 1958, the police took on all defence responsibilities. A 200-man paramilitary force, the Gambia Field Force, which was part of the police after 1958, maintained responsibility for internal security.

Operations 
The GPF has a Sea Police Patrol Unit as well as a small Air Force, which is not yet operational.

Training 
The GPF operates the Gambia Police Force Peacekeeping Center (GPFPC), which cooperates with the Peace Operations Training Institute (POTI) in training peacekeepers.

International cooperation 
Gambia Police Force has been part of Interpol since 6 October 1986. The Interpol National Central Bureau (NCB) for The Gambia is located in the GPF headquarters in Banjul. It is headed by a Commissioner who is assisted by an Assistant Superintendent of Police. Responsibilities of the NCB in The Gambia include human trafficking, terrorism, financial crime, fugitives, stolen works of art, and others.

List of Inspectors General

References

External links 
 Rank insignia of the Gambia Police Force

Military of the Gambia
Law enforcement in the Gambia